Butov may refer to
 13049 Butov, an asteroid
 Butov (surname)
 Butov (Czech Republic), municipality in the west of the Czech Republic.